Namundra is a genus of African long-spinneret ground spiders that was first described by Norman I. Platnick & T. L. Bird in 2007.

Species
 it contains five species, found only in Africa:
Namundra brandberg Platnick & Bird, 2007 – Namibia
Namundra griffinae Platnick & Bird, 2007 – Namibia
Namundra kleynjansi Platnick & Bird, 2007 – Namibia
Namundra leechi Platnick & Bird, 2007 – Angola
 Namundra murphyi Haddad, 2022 – South Africa

See also
 List of Gnaphosidae species

References

Araneomorphae genera
Prodidominae
Spiders of Africa